was a town located in Ōkawa District, Kagawa Prefecture, Japan.

On April 1, 2002, Nagao, along with the towns of Ōkawa, Sangawa, Shido and Tsuda (all from Ōkawa District), was merged to create the city of Sanuki.

History
November 1, 1959 - The part of Ido, Miki, Kagawa, Kita District is admitted.

Area composition 
 consisted of 4 hamlets.
 Hamlet (plains)
 Hamlet (plains)
 Hamlet (Mountainous region)
 Hamlet (Mountainous region)

Traffic 
Roadside Station

Famous building

References

Dissolved municipalities of Kagawa Prefecture
Sanuki, Kagawa